In a Heartbeat is a television series inspired by real life EMT squads whose staff consists of high school students in Darien, Connecticut. The series follows the lives of several teenagers who volunteer as part-time EMTs while going to school and trying to maintain their lives as normal teenagers. In Canada, the series was aired on Family Channel while in the United States it was aired on the Disney Channel. The series is fact-based, as there are teenage volunteer EMTs in service all across the United States.

Synopsis
The EMT squad is made up of Hank Beecham (Danso Gordon) who manages playing football with the high school team as well as being the EMT-Intermediate of the group; Val Lanier (Reagan Pasternak) who is noted for being an excellent student and cheerleader; Tyler Connell (Shawn Ashmore), a football player and Hank's best friend; and Jamie Waite (Christopher Ralph), the newest member of the squad initially there not by his own choice but as a result of a new program to help troubled teens get their life together by becoming EMTs.

Other characters in the series are Brooke Lanier (Lauren Collins), Val's twelve-year-old sister who volunteers with the squad after school and whose main job consists of managing the paperwork; and Caitie Roth (Jackie Rosenbaum), Val's best friend, a goth who is known for her dark clothes and purple-streaked hair.

Cast
 Danso Gordon as Hank Beecham
 Reagan Pasternak as Val Lanier
 Shawn Ashmore as Tyler Connell
 Christopher Ralph as Jamie Waite
 Lauren Collins as Brooke Lanier
 Jackie Rosenbaum as Caitie Roth

Episodes

Reception
Varietys Laura Fries reviewed the show favorably, remarking that "Disney's original high school drama series "In a Heartbeat" has characters every bit as appealing as anything you'd find on the WB, only a heck of a lot smarter." Lynne Heffley of Los Angeles Times described the show as "surprisingly watchable".

References

External links
 

2000s American teen drama television series
2000 American television series debuts
2001 American television series endings
2000s Canadian teen drama television series
2000 Canadian television series debuts
2001 Canadian television series endings
Television series by Disney
Television shows set in Connecticut
Disney Channel original programming
American teen drama television series
Canadian teen drama television series
Television series about teenagers
Fictional hospitals
Television shows filmed in Toronto
Television series by Alliance Atlantis
Television series by Corus Entertainment
Television series by Entertainment One
English-language television shows